Andrew Jackson "Slipstick" Libby is a fictional character featured in the "Future History" series of science fiction novels by Robert A. Heinlein.  He is an enormously talented and intuitive mathematician, but received little formal education.  His talent was first appreciated in the short story "Misfit", where he helps guide an asteroid into the correct orbit after the guidance computer has failed.

In later stories, his consciousness is transferred into a clone body, called Elizabeth Andrew Jackson Libby, (it was discovered that Libby was a hermaphrodite and he was given the choice to be male or female when he woke up).

References

Characters in written science fiction
Fictional mathematicians
Fictional transgender women
Robert A. Heinlein characters
Fictional LGBT characters in literature